Hans Carl von Carlowitz, originally Hannß Carl von Carlowitz (24 December 1645 - 3 March 1714), was a Saxon tax accountant and mining administrator. His book Sylvicultura oeconomica, oder haußwirthliche Nachricht und Naturmäßige Anweisung zur wilden Baum-Zucht (1713) was the first comprehensive treatise about forestry.  He is considered to be the father of sustainable yield forestry.

Life 
Hans Carl von Carlowitz was born in Oberrabenstein close to Chemnitz, nowadays a suburb of Chemnitz. He was the son of forest master Georg Carl von Carlowitz. He studied law and public administration in Jena, learned foreign languages, travelled to France, Russia and Italy in his youth and was engaged in the natural and mining sciences.

1677 he became a mining administrator and in 1711 he became in charge of mining at the court of Kursachsen in Freiberg (Sachsen). Freiberg, which is located in the foothills of the Erzgebirge, was known for its silver mines.  In this post, he was responsible, among other things, for the supply of timber to the mining industry, which employed about ten thousand miners at the time. He died in Freiberg.

Importance 

The idea of sustainability, wherever it occurs in the history, emerges in time of crisis and scarcity. Around 1700, the mining industry and livelihood of thousands was threatened in Saxony.  It was not that the mines had been exhausted of their ores, the problem was an acute scarcity of timber.  The mining industry and smelting of ores had consumed whole forests.  In the vicinity of places of mining activity the old growth forests had disappeared completely.  Trees had been cut at unsustainable rates for decades without efforts to restore the forests.  First, the river systems in the Erzgebirge was engineered, so logs could be transported from ever more distant forest areas, but these measures only postponed the crisis.  The prices for timber rose ever more, which led to bankruptcy and closure of parts of the mining industry.
Hans Carl von Carlowitz was raised in and influenced by this environment.  He traveled widely in his youth and learned much from the forced discipline of the French minister Jean Baptiste Colbert, who had enacted a forestry reform in France.

His importance as author is in the fact that he was the first one who comprehensively wrote about forestry. His treatise is a compilation of the knowledge about forest management at the time.  He used his own experience to expand the scientific knowledge base that remained after the devastation of the Thirty Years' War. Hans Carl von Carlowitz was the first one to clearly formulate the concept of sustainability in forestry (pages 105–106 in the Sylvicultura Oeconomica).

The full title of his book loosely translates as:

See also
Sylva, or A Discourse of Forest-Trees and the Propagation of Timber

References

Sources
Grober, Ulrich (German) DER ERFINDER DER NACHHALTIGKEIT DIE ZEIT Nr. 48/ 25.11.1999, page 98
Reprint of the 2. edition from 1732, Verlag Kessel, Reading rehearsal: 

1645 births
1714 deaths
People from the Electorate of Saxony
Sustainability advocates
German foresters
German male writers
Cameralists